Puti is a village in the Zestafoni Municipality of Imereti in western Georgia.

References

Populated places in Zestafoni Municipality